"Skins Fire" is a feature-length episode of E4 television series Skins. It aired in two parts in 2013 as part of a specially-commissioned seventh season marking the end of the programme. The first six series of Skins aired from 2007 to 2012, a teen drama focusing on the lives of three separate casts of Bristolian teenagers. While previous stories in the series were teen dramas, "Skins Fire" like other stories in the seventh season revisits characters from the show's first two casts, now facing young adulthood.

"Skins Fire" focuses on Kaya Scodelario's Effy Stonem, who appeared in the first four series of the show. In the story, former party girl Effy is a receptionist and later a stock trader for a London hedge fund who becomes embroiled in an insider trading scandal. Effy lives with Naomi Campbell (Lily Loveless), who is now her best friend. An ambitious idealist in the show's third and fourth series, Naomi in the present day finds herself drifting through life without a steady income when she is diagnosed with cancer.

Synopsis

Part 1
Effy - now aged 21, is working a dead-end job as a receptionist for a leading London hedge fund and lives in a flat with Naomi Campbell, who has become a slacker, while Emily is currently in New York on a lucrative internship. Her life is relatively dull, and her only relief comes in the form of cigarette breaks with her friends, Jane (Amy Wren), her colleague, and Dominic (Craig Roberts), a stock market researcher who works for a different part of the industry, and who has a crush on her. Her home life is no better, as Naomi, who is bored with no job and no Emily, has taken to inviting her stoner friends round for parties, with no regard to Effy's high workload. Although Effy is clearly annoyed by this, she is nevertheless very fond of Naomi, and continues to put up with her. She also occasionally allows her to share her bed when she has a fight with Emily on Skype. Unbeknownst to Effy, Naomi has been suffering from abdominal pains for some time, although when Effy notices, she brushes it off.

Whilst on the train home from work, Effy spots a mistake in the figures of one of the company reports she has been asked to print, and mentions it to her superior, Victoria (Lara Pulver). Victoria, a stock trader who is in a relationship with the head of the company, Jake (Kayvan Novak), pretends to ignore her, and then takes credit for the discovery at the next board meeting. Enraged, Effy decides she will need to upstage Victoria if she is to move up the company ladder, so she approaches Dominic and asks him to teach her the skills of the trade. After a couple of sessions with him, she deliberately fails to inform one of Victoria's investors of a delay in their meeting, holds the meeting herself, and manages to clinch the deal. Victoria is angered, but Jake is impressed by her initiative and skills in the trade, and offers her a job on the trade floor. Months later, Victoria has left the company after a falling out with Jake, but Effy is struggling to keep up, due to her lack of experience or real knowledge of the industry. Wanting another big breakthrough, Effy approaches Dominic again and, by playing on his attraction to her, convinces him to illegally give her some useful financial information about a deal that is about to fall through, with which she makes her company over a million pounds. Jake continues to be impressed by her, and the two begin to develop a relationship. Naomi, meanwhile, has decided to make her dreams of being a stand-up comedian a reality, and has managed to get a slot on an open-night gig at one of her favourite comedy bars, which Effy attends. The gig is a disaster, when Naomi's weak material falls flat, and she is unable to properly deal with some homophobic hecklers. Secretly, Naomi decides to go to the doctor about her abdominal pains and is devastated by the results. Later that night, Effy is awoken by the sound of Naomi blaring loud music on the balcony, and Naomi angrily reveals that she has been diagnosed with cancer.

Part 2
A few months later, Naomi is finding greater success as a stand-up comedian, even using her cancer as part of her routine. Effy and Jake are now in a relationship, and frequently attend Naomi's gigs. Emily has managed to get time off from her internship, and has flown over from New York to visit them, although Naomi is resistant to telling her the truth. Things are getting difficult at the Hedge Fund, however, and Jake, upon learning that Effy had help in her previous breakthrough, suggests she find help from the same source. However, things take a turn for the worse when Naomi's doctor informs her that her radiotherapy hasn't worked, and that she will have to start chemotherapy at once. Needing her breakthrough for her sake and Naomi's, Effy goes back to Dominic and asks him for help. Dominic angrily declares his undying love for her and demands that she leave him alone. He nevertheless provides her with another crucial piece of information, and, with Jake's help, they are able to make millions. A couple of months after that, Effy moves a considerably weaker Naomi to her new, lavishly furnished flat in Canary Wharf, although Naomi sadly states that she preferred her old flat. Soon after, though, Effy receives a call from the Financial Services Authority (which was replaced by the Financial Conduct Authority shortly after filming began), who have come up with evidence that her successful portfolios were the result of insider dealing, meaning she could face charges of market abuse. Effy is urged by Jake to deny everything. That night, Effy returns to the flat to find that Naomi has been vomiting incessantly all day, and is suffering with a horrific fever. Shocked by the state she is in, Effy quickly calls Dominic, who rushes over to help. The next day, while Dominic takes Naomi to the hospital, Effy goes to the FSA for her scheduled meeting, where she discovers that the FSA agent investigating her is Victoria. With Effy refusing to co-operate, Victoria decides to call in Dominic. Worried, Effy meets up with him at the hospital and tells him that the FSA are about to investigate him, but he is enraged that she is so preoccupied with her own life when her friend is alone in her hospital room, and storms off. Effy discovers that Naomi has disappeared from her room, and after a quick search, finds that she has gone up to the snowy roof to smoke a cigarette. A crying Naomi explains that her cancer has become terminal, and that she will now have to break her promise never to hurt Emily again. That night, Dominic turns up at her flat, angrily berating Effy for using him and for the way she has behaved, and announcing that the FSA has confiscated his laptop. Effy kisses him, and the two begin to initiate sex. However, Dominic sees that she is not genuinely willing and realises that she is just using sex as a means of pacifying him. Mortified, he leaves, never to return.

The next day, Effy goes into the office, and is confronted with the company's legal adviser. Jake places the blame for the insider dealing squarely with Effy, and suspends her from the company, to her devastation. After Effy finally tells Emily the truth, she flies over from New York at once, and angrily berates her for her lack of support for Naomi, telling her that she doesn't want her to visit Naomi that night. Deciding to do the right thing, Effy meets with Victoria, who sympathetically tells her that she knew Jake would just ditch Effy when it suited him, and convinces her to give a statement confessing to the market abuse charges and stating Jake's complicity, which will reduce her prison sentence significantly. Before going through with it, Effy drops by the hospital, and urges Emily to forgive Naomi for not telling her sooner. Emily enters the bedroom, and tearfully embraces her girlfriend, and Naomi gives Effy a smile over Emily's shoulder, knowing that she will die peacefully with her beloved Emily at her side. Effy then proceeds to the FSA's offices and signs her statement. Effy then leaves the FSA offices and is taken into custody. Her trademark wry smile crosses her face as the episode ends.

Reception

"Skins Fire" received mixed reviews, with Caroline Preece from Den of Geek noting that the two-parter became progressively more bleak as it went on. Writing of the first part, Adrian Michaels of The Daily Telegraph stated: "The fact that all the plot progression was extremely predictable, and that only the characters of Effy and her flatmate Naomi (Lily Loveless) were more than, er, skin-deep, would surely have sunk most drama. But happily it did not. Skins was a triumph of slick over substance."

References

Skins (British TV series) episodes
2013 British television episodes